Bayerischer Fernsehpreis (the Bavarian TV award) is an award presented by the government of Bavaria, Germany since 1989. The prize symbol is the "Blue Panther", a figure from the Nymphenburg Porcelain Manufactory. The prize money is €10,000 (Special prize: €20,000).

Winners

2021 
 Michaela May, Honorary Award of the Bavarian Prime Minister
 Thomas Heise and Claas Meyer-Heuer in the information category for The Power of the Clans
 Daniel Harrich in the information category for the documentary Spur des Terrors
 Karoline Schuch Best Actress for her role in The Secret of the Dead Forest
 Rainer Bock Best Actor for his roles in Der Überläufer and Das Boot 2
 Franziska Schlotterer in the category Directing for Totgeschwiegen
  for screenplay Tatort: In der Familie und Der Überläufer
 Felix Cramer in the Camera category for Oktoberfest 1900
 Carolin Kebekus and Shary Reeves in the entertainment category for Brennpunkt Racism
 Nora Kauven in the entertainment category for Showtime of my Life – Stars Against Cancer
 Cristina Trebbi and Jobst Knigge in the culture and education category for The world at a distance – journey through a special year
 Max Uthoff and Claus von Wagner Special Prize (undated) for Die Anstalt
 Klaus Steinbacher Young Talent Award for Oktoberfest 1900

2020 
 Carolin Reiber, Honorary Award of the Bavarian Prime Minister
 Aylin Tezel, Best Actress for her role in The Singing Butchers Society
 Felix Klare, Best Actor for his role in Because you belong to me
 Katrin Bühlig, for her screenplay Because you belong to me
 Emma Bading, young talent award for her acting performance in the ARD Movie Play
 Thilo Mischke in the information category for his ProSieben report Germans on the ISIS front
 ZDF for finally a widower
 Christian Klandt for We are now as the best youth series (RTL2)
 BR cooking show Landfrauenküche in the entertainment category
 Sebastian Pufpaff for Pufpaff's Happy Hour in the entertainment category (ZDF)
 Maxine Brückner and Florian Hartung in the culture and education section for childhood under the swastika – 80 years of World War II (VOX)
 Jonas Nay and David Grabowski for Best Score at The Singing Butchers Club
 Friedrich Scherer and Winfried Laasch for One Day in Auschwitz (ZDF)

2019 
 Elmar Wepper and Fritz Wepper, honorary award of the Bavarian Prime Minister
 Natalie Spinell Young Talent Award for Servus Baby
 Anna Schudt Best Actress for Departure to Freedom
 Jan Josef Liefers Best Actor for Arthur's Law
 Axel Brüggemann, Culture and education, for moderating the Wagner Festival in Bayreuth
 Sonja Rom, Camera, for Decomposed – A case for Dr. Abel
 Maren Kroymann, Entertainment
 Ulf Röller, Foreign correspondent
 Holger Karsten Schmidt Screenplay for Gladbeck
 Gero von Boehm Producer and Director for Exodus? – A History of the Jews in Europe
 Mark Monheim and Max Eipp Director for Everything Isy
 Astrid Quentell Producer for The Teacher
 Das Boot, Special Prize

2018 
 Hape Kerkeling, honorary award of the Bavarian Prime Minister
 Julia Jentsch, best actress in the TV film / series and series category for her role in Das Verschicken (ARD)
 Maximilian Brückner, best actor in the TV film / series and series category for his role in Hindafing (BR)
 Neuesuper GmbH by Simon Amberger, Korbinian Dufter and Rafael Parente, Young Talent Award
 Stefanie Albrecht as an author and reporter for twisting facts and fake news: Undercover in alternative media (RTL)
 Stephan Lamby as a journalist for his political documentaries Nervous Republic, The duel – Merkel against Schulz and Bimbes – The black coffers of Helmut Kohl (all ARD)
 Claudia Garde in the category television films / series and series as director of the television films Eine Gute Mutter (ARD) and Das Nebelhaus (SAT1)
 Christian Schwochow as director of the series Bad Banks (ZDF)
 Robert Löhr as best screenwriter for the series Das Institut (BR, NDR, WDR, Puls, ARD Alpha)
 Thomas Hermanns in the entertainment category as moderator of the entertainment program 25 years of nonsense Comedy Club (Sky)
 Mark Land as Executive Producer of the entertainment program Ninja Warrior Germany (RTL / Norddeich.TV)
 Daniel Harting, Amai Haukamp and Anne Morgan in the culture and education category as authors of the report Mann oder Frau? – Living in the Wrong Body (VOX)
 Babylon Berlin (Sky, ARD DEGETO), special price

2017 
 Gerhard Polt, honorary award of the Bavarian Prime Minister, he is an expert on the character of the Bavarians
 Sonja Gerhardt, Best Actress in the categories TV Movies / Series and Series for her roles in Jack the Ripper – A woman hunts a murderer (Sat.1) and Ku'damm 56 (ZDF)
 Devid Striesow, Best Actor in the TV Movies / Series and Series categories for his roles in Das weiße Kaninchen (ARD) und  (ARD)
 Katrin Nemec, young talent award as an author for her graduation film About Loving and Dying as a film student
 Arndt Ginzel and Marcus Weller as authors and reporters of the article Exclusiv im Erste: Spiel im Schatten – Putin's undeclared war against the West (ARD)
 Felix von der Laden, as presenter of Like or Dislike: YouTuber Dner in the US Election Campaign (ZDF)
 Christian Becker, as producer of the film Winnetou (RTL)
 Christian Schwochow as director of the television film  of the ARD trilogy NSU German History X
 Daniela Knapp, as camerawoman of the TV film  (ARD)
 Martin Eigler, Sönke Lars Neuwohner and Sven S. Poser, as authors of the TV series Morgen hör ich auf (ZDF)
 Matthew Kowalski, as executive producer of the entertainment program: The Voice of Germany (season 6) (ProSieben/SAT.1)
 Carmen Butta and Gabriele Riedle, as authors of the documentary The Secret Revolution – Women in Saudi Arabia (ZDF)
 Lars Friedrich, as the author and director of the documentary Melancholy and Lightness. Dietl's Journey (BR)

2016 
 Senta Berger, honorary award from the Bavarian Prime Minister for outstanding achievements in German television
 Tobias Krell, Young Talent Award as a reporter in the documentary Checker Tobi Extra – Why so many people flee (BR/ARD/KIKA)
 Nina Kunzendorf, as best actress in the categories television films / series and series for her role in Nacht der Angst (ZDF)
 Antonia Rados, as author of the reportage Nachtjournal-special: The IS-Connection (RTL)
 Güner Yasemin Balcı, as author and director of the documentary Der Jungfrauenwahn (ZDF/ARTE)
 Ralf Husmann and Peter Güde, as authors of the film Beware of People (WDR/ARD)
 , as director of the television film Two Lives, One Hope (SAT.1) and the TV series Club der roten Bänder (VOX)
 Bantry Bay Productions Gerda Müller and Jan Kromschröder, as producers of the television series Club der roten Bänder (VOX)
 Olli Dittrich, as author and actor of Schorsch Aigner – The man who was Franz Beckenbauer (ARD)
 Sky sports department, represented by sports director Roman Steuer and commentator Wolf-Christoph Fuss, for the Sky Bundesliga conference – the original (Sky)
 Dietmar Klumpp, as author and director of the report: Fight for peace in the Congo – the largest UN mission in the world (life adventure) (Kabel eins)
 Mike Conway, as author and director of the documentary Nobody is allowed to know – Corinne and her secret (ZDF)

2015 
 Jörg Armbruster, honorary award from the Bavarian Prime Minister for outstanding achievements in German television
 Mala Emde, Young Talent Award for her role as Anne Frank in My Daughter Anne Frank (ARD/HR/RBB/WDR)
 Gabriela Sperl, Quirin Berg, Max Wiedemann, Special prize as producer of the three-part series Tannbach (ZDF)
 Angela Andersen and Claus Kleber, as authors of the two-part documentary Hunger! Thirst! (ZDF)
 Philipp Kadelbach, as best director in the category television films / series and series for Naked Among Wolves (ARD/MDR)
 Ferdinand von Schirach and André Georgi, for achievements as a book author and as a screenwriter of the story and the film Volksfest (ZDF)
 Helene Fischer, for The Helene Fischer Show 2014 (ZDF)
 Mario Barth, for Mario Barth reveals! (RTL)
 Patrick Hörl, as director and producer of the documentary Fukushima – Nothing is as it was (BR)
 Eckhart Querner, as author of the documentary Der Sänger Christian Gerhaher (BR)
 Andrea Mocellin and Thomas Muggenthaler, as authors of the documentary Crime Love – by Polish forced laborers and German women (BR)
 Felicitas Woll, as best actress in the categories television films / series and series for her role in The Disobedience (Sat.1)
 Matthias Brandt, as best actor in the categories television films / series and series for his role in A Faithful Husband (ARD / HR)

2014 
 Otto Waalkes, honorary award of the Bavarian Prime Minister for his life's work
 Julia Koschitz, Best Actress in the TV Film category for her role in Take Care of Him! (ZDF)
 Kai Wiesinger, best actor in the TV film category for his role in the docudrama The Resignation (Sat.1)
 Gisela Schneeberger, Best Actress in the Series and Series category for her role in The Spin Cycle (BR)
 Alexander Held, best actor in the series and series category for his role in Munich Murder (ZDF)
 Young talent promotion award of the LfA Förderbank Bayern for the producers Lüthje Schneider Hörl Film GbR for their television series Lerchenberg of the ZDF
 Thomas Liesen, as author and producer in the information category for the film Live, love, forget – Alzheimer's at 40 (ARD)
 André Schäfer, as director and producer in the information category for Willy Brandt – Memories of a Politician's Life (ARD/WDR)
 Hilmer Rolff, as a producer in the information category for the miniseries From Spreewaldgurken to FKK – Die DDR privat (n-tv)
 Günter Schütter, as author for the television film Polizeiruf 110: Death makes angels out of us all (ARD/BR)
 Gero Steffen, as cameraman for the television film Tatort: ​​Auf immer Dein (ARD/WDR)
 Friedemann Fromm, as director of Weissensee, 2. Season (ARD)
 Palina Rojinski, Nikeata Thompson and Howard Donald, as a jury on Got to Dance (ProSieben and Sat.1)
 Ralf Blasius, as author and director of the documentary Terra X: Expedition Germany – A journey through 500 million years (ZDF)
 Sylvia Griss and Franz Xaver Karl, as editors of Capriccio (BR)
 Kai Pflaume, as host and discussion partner of the series Show me your world (ARD)

2013 
 Ruth Maria Kubitschek, honorary award from the Bavarian Prime Minister for her life's work
 Nadja Uhl as best actress in the television film category for her roles in Operation Zucker (ARD/WDR, BR) and The Tower (ARD/MDR, BR, NDR, WDR, SWR, RBB)
 Caroline Peters as best actress in the series and series category for her role in Mord mit Aussicht – The Venus of Hengasch (ARD)
 Charly Hübner as best actor in the series and series category for his role in Polizeiruf 110 – Fischerkrieg (ARD/NDR)
 Alicia von Rittberg: Young Talent Award of the LfA Förderbank Bayern for her performance as an actress in And all have been silent (ZDF)
 Katharina Schüttler, Miriam Stein, Volker Bruch, Tom Schilling and Ludwig Trepte: Special prize for the ensemble of actors in Generation War (ZDF)
 Guido Knopp as head of the Weltenbrand series (ZDF)
 Frank Rudnick as the author of Innocent in prison – victims of justice and their fight against wrongful convictions (VOX)
 Sebastian Dehnhardt, Manfred Oldenburg and Jobst Knigge as authors and directors of the documentary Drei Leben: Axel Springer (ARTE/ZDF)
 Jochen Alexander Freydank for directing Und weg bist du (SAT.1)
 Rola Bauer as producer for World Without End (SAT.1)
 Christian Lyra and Sebastian Wehlings as Writers of Add a Friend (TNT Series)
 Oliver Welke as moderator of the heute-show (ZDF)
 Arne Kreutzfeldt as Executive Producer of Undercover Boss – Kamps (RTL)
 Denis Scheck as moderator of freshly printed – new books with Denis Scheck (ARD/BR, NDR, WDR, HR)

2012 
 Udo Wachtveitl and Miroslav Nemec, honorary award from the Bavarian Prime Minister for their life's work
 Anna Loos, actress, for The Teacher (ZDF)
 Armin Rohde, actor, for going it alone (ARD/BR)
 Anja Kling, actress, for Hannah Mangold & Lucy Palm (SAT.1)
 Matthias Brandt, actor, for Polizeiruf 110 – Because they don't know what they do (ARD/BR)
 Friedrich Ani and Ina Jung, screenwriters, for The Invisible Girl (ZDF/arte)
 Maria von Heland, director, for Die Sterntaler (ARD/SWR)
 Andreas Prochaska, director, for A Day for a Miracle (ZDF)
 Andreas Bareiss and Sven Burgemeister, producers, for Die Rache der Wanderhure (SAT.1)
 Monika Anthes and Edgar Verheyen, Reporter, for Das System Wiesenhof (ARD Exclusiv) ARD/SWAR
 Peter Kloeppel, presenter and author, for September 11 – How one day changed our lives (RTL)
 Birgit Kappel and Sabina Wolf, authors, for The economy in the sights of online criminals (ARD Exclusiv) ARD/BR
 Monika Gruber, Comedian, for The Big Nonsense Variety Show, Monika Gruber live 2011, Grünwald Friday comedy (ProSieben/BR)
 Sylvie van der Vaart and Daniel Hartwich, moderators, for Let's Dance (RTL)
 Harald Lesch, Moderator, for Adventure Research: Drilling or chilling? The way to the super child (ZDF)
 Henryk M. Broder and Hamed Abdel-Samad, moderators, for Either Broder – Die Deutschland-Safari (ARD/HR/BR/SR)
 Young Talent Award of the LfA Förderbank Bayern for Rüdiger Heinze and Stefan Sporbert for Screams of the Forgotten (ProSieben)

2011 
 Iris Berben, honorary award of the Bavarian Prime Minister for her life's work
 Antonia Rados, Special Prize for Middle East Reporting (RTL/n-tv)
 Vladimir Burlakov, actor, young talent award for Marco W. – 247 days in Turkish prison (SAT.1)
 Andreas Kuno Richter for his documentary Der Verrat. How the Stasi abused children and young people as spies (RTL/n-tv)
 Mike Lingenfelser and Thomas Kießling, authors of The Biofuels Scandal – Climate Policy in a Dead End (BR)
 Johannes Hano, author of the travel report China's borders (ZDF)
 Max Färberböck, director, for sow number four. A Lower Bavaria thriller (BR)
 Hermine Huntgeburth, director, for Neue Vahr Süd (ARD/WDR/Radio Bremen)
 Dominik Graf, director, for Im Angesicht des Verbrechens (ARD/WDR)
 Stefan Scheich and Robert Dannenberg, authors of Der letzte Bulle (SAT.1)
 Ute Biernat, producer of X Factor (VOX)
 Richard Ladkani and Volker Tittel for The Vatican – The Hidden World (ARD/BR)
 Markus Kavka for the music documentary Number One! – Ozzy Osbourne (Cable 1)
 Andrea Sawatzki as best actress in the TV film category for Bella Vita (ZDF neo)
 Frederick Lau as best actor in the television film category for Neue Vahr Süd
  as best actress in the series category for Tatort: Never be free again
 Henning Baum as best actor in the series and series category for Der letzte Bulle

2010 
 Klaus Doldinger, honorary award of the Bavarian Prime Minister
 Till Endemann, special prize for directing Flight into the Night – the Accident at Überlingen (ARD)
 Jörg Wontorra for one-two (Sport1)
 Peter Mezger for foreign reporting from Iran (BR/ARD)
 Düzen Tekkal and Jan Rasmus for Extra Special: Fear of the new neighbors (RTL)
 Niki Stein for writing and directing Until Nothing Remains (ARD/SWR)
 Carolin Hecht for the book Alone among students (Sat.1)
 Nina Gummich, Young Talent Award for her role in Alone Among Pupils
 Stefan Raab as initiator and jury president for Our Star for Oslo (ProSieben/ARD)
 Uta von Borries and Stephan Rebelein for 37 degrees – life on the smallest foot (ZDF)
 Thomas Kufus and Volker Heise for 24h Berlin – A day in the life (ARTE/RBB)
 Senta Berger as best actress in the television film category for her role in the film Frau Böhm says no (WDR/ARD)
 Herbert Knaup for best actor in the television film category for his role in the film Thanksgiving
 Annette Frier as best actress in the series and series category for her role in the series Danni Lowinski (Sat.1)
 Florian Martens as best actor in the series and serials category for his role in the crime series Ein starkes Team (ZDF)

2009 
 Christoph Süß, Presenter of quer [Across] (ARD/BR)
 Richard C. Schneider, Correspondent of Bayerischer Rundfunk, for Tage des Schreckens [Days of fear] (ARD/BR)
 Roland Suso Richter, Special award for Mogadischu (ARD/BR and SWR)
 Julia von Heinz, Nachwuchsförderpreis (Youth Award) for screenplay and director of Standesgemäß [According to social status] (ARD/BR und SWR)
 Matti Bauer, writer and director of Domspatzen (arte/BR)
 Falko Korth and Thomas Riedel as writers and directors of the documentary Freiheit! Das Ende der DDR [Freedom! The end of the German Democratic Republic] (Sat.1)
 Silke Zertz, writer of Wir sind das Volk [We are the people] (Sat.1)
 Bora Dağtekin for Doctor's Diary (RTL)
 Walter Moers for Die drei Bärchen und der blöde Wolf [The three little bears and the big daft wolf] (ARD/WDR)
 Christian Rach for Rach, der Restaurant-Tester [Rach, the restaurant reviewer] (RTL)
 Dr. Petra Lidschreiber for Ein Jude der Deutschland liebte [A Jew who loved Germany] (ARD/rbb)
 Anja Kling as best actress in the category television film for Wir sind das Volk [We are the people] (Sat.1)
 Ken Duken as best actor in the category television film for Willkommen zuhause [Welcome home] (ARD/SWR)
 Diana Amft as best actress in the category series for Doctor's Diary (RTL)
 Manfred Zapatka as best actor in the category series for KDD – Kriminaldauerdienst [Permanent criminal investigation service] (ZDF)
 Christiane Hörbiger, Bavarian Prime Minister's award for Der Besuch der alten Dame [The visit of the old Lady] (ARD), Zwei Ärzte sind einer zu viel [Two doctors are one more than needed] (ZDF) and for lifetime achievement

2008 
 Katharina Wackernagel as Best Actress in the television film category for Contergan (ARD) and Mein Mörder kommt zurück [My murderer returns] (ZDF)
 Edgar Selge as Best Actor in the television film category for Angsthasen [Scaredy-cats] (BR/ARD)
 Alexandra Neldel as Best Actress in the series category for Unschuldig [Innocent] (ProSieben)
 Axel Milberg as Best Actor in the series category for Doktor Martin (ZDF)
 Karsten Scheuren as writer and director of Galileo Special Grab in eisigen Höhen – Bergung aus der Todeszone [A grave in icy heights – rescue from the zone of death] (ProSieben)
 Thomas Präkelt as writer and producer of Der Arbeitsbeschaffer [The job-finder] (RTL)
 Wolf von Lojewski as writer and director of Meine Heimat, Deine Heimat – mit Wolf von Lojewski durch Ostpreußen [My homeland, your homeland – through East Prussia with Wolf von Lojewski] (ZDF)
 Hermine Huntgeburth for directing  [Hellion] (WDR/NDR/Arte/ARD)
 Detlef Michel as writer of Eine folgenschwere Affäre [An affair with consequences] (ZDF)
 Anke Engelke and Bastian Pastewka for Fröhliche Weihnachten! – mit Wolfgang & Anneliese [Merry Christmas with Wolfgang & Anneliese] (Sat.1)
 Hape Kerkeling for Kerkeling liest – Ich bin dann mal weg [Kerkeling reads – So I'm gone now] (RTL)
 Thomas Weidenbach and Shi Ming as writers, directors, and producers of Chinas Größenwahn am Yangtse [China's megalomania on the Yangtze] (arte/ARD)
 Janina Stopper, Nachwuchsförderpreis (Youth Award) for her supporting role as Mother Anne Kempf in the Tatort  episode Kleine Herzen [Little Hearts] (ARD)
 Dieter Kronzucker, Bavarian Prime Minister's award
 Trixter Film GmbH Michael Coldewey and Simone Kraus, special award for the development and implementation of virtual characters in the film Das Wunder von Loch Ness [The miracle of Loch Ness] (Sat.1)

2007 
Rosemarie Fendel as Best Actress for Das zweite Leben [Second Life] (BR/ARD)
Friedrich von Thun as Best Actor for Helen, Fred und Ted (ARD – BR as coproducer)
Saskia Vester as Best Actress for KDD – Kriminaldauerdienst (ZDF)
Christian Ulmen as Best Actor for Dr. Psycho (ProSieben)
Rosalie Thomass  Nachwuchsförderpreis (Youth Award) for her theatrical performances in (among others) Polizeiruf 110:  (ARD)
Friedemann Fromm for directing, among others, the Tatort episode "Außer Gefecht" [Incapacitated] (BR/ARD)
Juliane Schuler for the long-term documentary film Marcel – Ein Kämpchen, das wär' schön (BR/ARD)
Cordula Stratmann in the Comedy category for Schillerstraße [Schiller Street] (Sat.1)
Daniel Speck for his screenplay for  [My crazy Turkish wedding] (ProSieben)
Holly Fink for cinematography in the miniseries Die Flucht [March of Millions] (ARD)
Richard Gress, special award for his documentary about the Surma people in Ethiopia: Voxtours: Reise zu den letzten Gladiatoren [Voxtours: journey to the last gladiators] (VOX)
Ralf Benkö for his reportage about astronaut Thomas Reiter Ein Deutscher im All (RTL)
Manfred Oldenburg for his sports documentary Das verflixte dritte Tor – Wembley '66 – Die wahre Geschichte [That damn third goal – Wembley '66 – The true story] (ZDF)
Bayerischer Rundfunk, special award for the charity event Sternstunden [Magic Moments]
Frank Elstner, Bavarian Prime Minister's award

2006 
 Heike Makatsch as actress in the area of television plays for Margarete Steiff
 Matthias Brandt as actor in the area of television plays for In Sachen Kaminski [Concerning Kaminski]
 Jutta Speidel as best actress in a serial for Um Himmels Willen [For Heaven's sake]
 Fritz Wepper as best actor in a serial for Um Himmels Willen
 Felicitas Woll Youth Award for her performance in the TV film Dresden
 Beate Langmaack for a screenplay of Polizeiruf 110 episode Vorwärts wie rückwärts [Forwards like backwards]
 Frank Plasberg in the field of information for his moderation of the political program Hart aber fair [Hard but fair]
 Matti Geschonneck for directing the television films Die Nachrichten [The News] and  [Silver wedding anniversary]
 Frank-Markus Barwasser (also known as Erwin Pelzig) and the BR show Aufgemerkt! Pelzig unterhält sich [Attention! Pelzig chats] in the field of entertainment
 Nico Hofmann, special award for Dresden,  [The Airlift] and  [Storm Tide]
 Joachim Lang for the children's show Tigerenten Club (ARD)
 Klaus Feichtenberger for book and direction of ZDF series Expedition – der Kontinent [Expedition – the continent]
 Lisa Eder and Thomas Wartmann for book and direction of the documentary Jenseits von Samarkand – eine usbekische Liebesgeschichte [Beyond Samarkand – an Usbek love story] (SWR/arte)
 Jürgen Ast and Daniel Ast for the documentary Abrechnung mit Stalin – das Jahr 1956 [Settling the score with Stalin – the year 1956] (Arte/RBB)
 Jens Kemper and Mark Brauckmann for the RTL documentary Mein Chef der Bundeskanzler – Ludwig Erhard aus der Nähe und in Farbe [My boss the chancellor – Ludwig Erhard close-ups in colour]
 Hannelore Elsner, Bavarian Prime Minister's award

2005 
 Ulrike Kriener for her performance as an actress in Kommissarin Lucas – Vergangene Sünden [Commissioner Lucas – Sins of the past] and Kommissarin Lucas – Vertrauen bis zuletzt [Trust until the end] (ZDF)
 Ulrich Mühe und Gregor Edelmann for the script and acting performance in Der letzte Zeuge (ZDF)
 Heike Richter-Karst for producing of the Polizeiruf 110 episodes "Winterende" [End of the winter] and "Dumm wie Brot" [Thick as a brick] (NDR/ARD)
 Franz Xaver Bogner for book and direction of the series München 7 (BR)
 Christoph Maria Herbst for his acting performance in the entertainment series Stromberg (Pro7)
 Isabel Kleefeld for directing the television film Das Gespenst von Canterville [The ghost of Canterville] (Sat.1)
 Bastian Pastewka for his performance as an actor in the broadcast Ohne Worte [Wordless] (RTL)
 Sebastian Koch for his acting performance in the television film Speer und Er Speer and Him (WDR/NDR/BR/ARD/ORF)
 Andrea Morgenthaler for the documentary Joseph Goebbels (SWR/WDR/ARD)
 Dan Setton and Helmar Büchel for directing the report In Gottes Namen – Die Rekruten des Heiligen Krieges [In the name of God – the recruits of the Holy War] (Spiegel TV/RTL)
 Theo Koll for presenting the broadcast Frontal 21 (ZDF), as a proxy for the entire editorial staff
 Rainer Kaufmann for directing the television films  (ZDF) and Marias letzte Reise [Maria's last journey] (BR/ARD)
 Evita Bauer for book and direction of Lena Christ – Heimat und Sehnsucht [Lena Christ – homeland and longing] (BR)
 Monica Bleibtreu, Nina Kunzendorf and Michael Fitz, special award for their acting performances in the television film Marias letzte Reise (BR/ARD)
 Joachim Fuchsberger, Bavarian Prime Minister's award

2004 
 Kaspar Heidelbach and Götz Weidner for the television film  [Das Wunder von Lengede] (Sat.1)
 Axel Stäck for the script of the television film Mein erster Freund, Mutter und ich [My first friend, Mother and I] (ProSieben)
 Dagmar Manzel for the television film Leben wäre schön [Life would be nice] (BR/ARD)
 Veronica Ferres for the television films Annas Heimkehr [Anna's returning home] (BR/ARD), Für immer verloren [Lost forever] (Sat.1) and Stärker als der Tod [Stronger than death] (ZDF)
 Tobias Moretti for the television film  (BR/SWR/ARD/Arte/ORF/SF DRS)
 Wolfgang Stumph for the TV series Stubbe – Von Fall zu Fall [Stubbe – From case to case] (ZDF)
 Marc Conrad and Friedrich Wildfeuer for the TV series Abschnitt 40 (RTL)
 Heidi Umbreit and Bernd Umbreit for the documentary "Sam und Tim – geboren an der Grenze des Lebens" [Sam and Tim – born at the edge of life] from the series Menschen hautnah [Close to people] (WDR/ARD)
 Meinhard Prill for the episode "Von Himmel und Erde – Alltag im Kloster Landshut-Seligenthal" [On Heaven and Earth – Life in the Landshut-Seligenthal monastery] from the series Irgendwo in Bayern [Somewhere in Bavaria] (BFS) and "Kulisse für alle Zeiten – der Stadtplatz von Eggenfelden" [A scenery for eternity – the town square of Eggenfelden] from the program series  Unter unserem Himmel [Under our skies] (BFS)
 Dominique Klughammer for the film Jung, erfolgreich – arbeitslos [Young, successful… unemployed] from the program series  37° (ZDF)
 Danuta Harrich-Zandberg and Walter Harrich for the documentary Der Contergan-Skandal [The contergan row] (NDR/ARD)
 Hape Kerkeling for the entertainment program Die 70er Show [The 70's show] (RTL)
 Artem Demenok and Andreas Christoph Schmidt, special award for the documentary Helden ohne Ruhm – der 17. Juni 1953 [Heroes without glory – 17 June 1953] (RBB/ARD/Arte)
 Ruth Drexel, Special award for lifetime achievement
 Harry Valérien Bavarian Prime Minister's award

2003 
 Anke Engelke and Olli Dittrich for Blind Date – Taxi nach Schweinau (ZDF)
 Götz George and Klaus J. Behrendt for Mein Vater [My father] (WDR/ARD)
 Matti Geschonneck for Die Mutter [The mother] (WDR/ARD)
 Hannelore Hoger for the Bella Block episode "Tödliche Nähe" [Fatal closeness] (ZDF)
 Maybrit Illner for the Berlin Mitte political magazine (ZDF)
 Rebecca Immanuel and Christoph M. Ohrt for the Edel & Starck series (Sat.1)
 Max Thomas Mehr for the screenplay of "Sebnitz – die perfekte Story" [Sebnitz – the perfect story] from the series Ein Tag mit Folgen [A day with consequences] (arte)
 Jan Mojto for producing Napoléon (ZDF)
 Jochen Richter for Landschaften der Erde [Landscapes of the Earth] (BR/ARD)
 Britta Stöckle for the screenplay for Geht nicht, gibt’s nicht [lit.: 'It won't work', doesn't work.] (ZDF)
 Hilmar Thate for Operation Rubikon (ProSieben)
 Willi Weitzel for Willi will's wissen (BR/WDR/KI.KA)
 Andre Zalbertus and Peter Kloeppel for Kanzler, Krisen, Koalitionen [Chancellors, crises, coalitions] (RTL)
 Special award for Horst Tappert in Derrick (ZDF)
 Special award for the editors of 50 years of Tagesschau (ARD)
 Helmut Dietl, Bavarian Prime Minister's award

2002 
 Heinz Baumann for Adelheid und ihre Mörder (NDR/ARD)
 Monica Bleibtreu, Veronica Ferres, Jürgen Hentsch, Sebastian Koch, Armin Mueller-Stahl and Sophie Rois for Die Manns – Ein Jahrhundertroman [The Mann family – a novel of the century]
 Peter Dudzik for reporting from the Middle East (BR/ARD)
 Gisela Graichen as the author of the archaeology series Schliemanns Erben Schliemann's heirs (ZDF)
 Mariele Millowitsch  for the serie Nikola (RTL)
 Jens Niehuss for "Einsatz für den Flugzeugträger: Leben auf der USS-Roosevelt" [A mission for the aircraft carrier: Life on USS Roosevelt] (ProSieben)
 Werner Reuß as editorial chief of BR-alpha
 Charlotte Roche for Fast Forward (VIVA)
 Jens Schanze and Börres Weiffenbach for the documentary Otzenrather Sprung [The Otzenrath jump] (ZDF/3Sat)
 Dieter Thoma and Volker Weicker for Skispringen: Vierschanzentournee [Ski jumping: Four Hills Tournament] (RTL) 
 Vicco von Bülow, Bavarian Prime Minister's award

2001 
 Aiman Abdallah and Susanne Wiesner for the popular science series Galileo (ProSieben)
 Hans-Christoph Blumenberg and Ulrich Lenze for the television film Deutschlandspiel [The Germany Game] (ZDF/Arte)
 Sebastian Dehnhardt, Christian Frey and Meinhard Prill for Die Vertriebenen – Hitlers letzte Opfer [The displaced – Hitler's last victims] (MDR/NDR/ARD)
 Heino Ferch and Roland Suso Richter for the television film The Tunnel (Sat.1)
 Vivian Naefe, Miroslav Nemec and Udo Wachtveitl for Tatort (BR/ARD)
 Christiane Hörbiger for the soap Julia – Eine ungewöhnliche Frau [Julia – an extraordinary lady] (SR/ARD/ORF)
 Christian Jeltsch for Einer geht noch [One for the road!] (BR/SWR/arte) und Rote Glut [Red heat] (ZDF/Arte)
 Peter Schönhofer and Thomas Grimm for Faust – der Tragödie erster und zweiter Teil Faust– acts 1 and 2 (ZDF/Arte/3sat/ZDF-Theaterkanal)
 Sandra Maischberger for her political talk show Maischberger (n-tv)
 Gert Scobel for Kulturzeit [Culture time] (3sat)
 Michael Mandlik for reporting from Rome and Vatican City (BR/ARD)
 Günther Jauch, Bavarian Prime Minister's award

2000 
 Martina Gedeck for acting performance in Deine besten Jahre [Your best years] (Arte/ZDF)
 Bernd Grote for the series 2000 Jahre Christentum [2000 years of Christendom]
 Bernadette Heerwagen for Der Schandfleck [The eyesore]
 Hans-Hermann Hertle and Gunther Scholz as directors of Als die Mauer fiel. 50 Stunden, die die Welt veränderten [When the Berlin Wall fell. 50 hours that changed the world] (SFB)
 Janusch Kozminski and Richard Chaim Schneider as producer of Wir sind da! – Juden in Deutschland nach 1945 [We're there! Jews in Germany after 1945] (WDR/BR)
 Jan-Josef Liefers for directing and acting performance in Jack’s Baby
 Peter Lohmeyer for acting performance in Der Elefant in meinem Bett [The elephant in my bed]
 Hans Werner Meyer for acting performance in Und morgen geht die Sonne wieder auf [And tomorrow the sun will rise again] and Die Cleveren [The smart ones] (RTL)
 Christine Neubauer for acting performance in Frische Ware [Fresh goods] (BR)
 Elmar Paulke for the documentary Boris Becker – I did it my way (DSF)
 Julian Pölsler, Hans-Michael Rehberg and Bernadette Heerwagen, special award for directing Der Schandfleck (BR/ARD)
 Antje Schmidt for the TV films Und morgen geht die Sonne wieder auf (RTL) and Der Elefant in meinem Bett (ProSieben)
  for the TV film  (ZDF)
 Walter Flemmer, Bavarian Prime Minister's award

1999 
 Bayerischer Rundfunk for the ARD network reporting on the Kosovo War (Dr. Gerhard Fuchs and Sigmund Gottlieb as proxies)
 Thomas Berger and Barbara Jago for the script to Busenfreunde 2 – Alles wird gut [Bosom Buddies 2 – It's going to be alright]
 Axel Engstfeld for Im Bannkreis des Nordens – Labyrinth des Todes [Under the spell of the North – Labyrinth of death]
 Oliver Hirschbiegel for Todfeinde – Die falsche Entscheidung [Sworn enemies – The wrong decision]
 Dariusz Jablonski for Der Fotograf [The photographer]
 Kathi Leitner für Einmal leben [Living for once]
 Jan Peter for the episode "Drei Tage im August" [Three days in August] from the History series (ZDF)
 Dieter Pfaff for the episode "Sperling und der brennende Arm" [Sperling and the burning arm] from the Sperling police series
 Harald Schmidt for Die Harald Schmidt Show (Sat.1)
 Dror Zahavi for the episode "Die Todfreundin" [lit: the deadly girlfriend] from the series Doppelter Einsatz
 Jo Baier, special award for the television play  [The store] after the novel by Erwin Strittmatter
 Thomas Gottschalk, Bavarian Prime Minister's award

1998 
 Friedhelm Brebeck for his reports on the various crises in the former Yugoslavia
 Karoline Eichhorn for the TV film 
 Heiner Gatzemaier, Ingeborg Jacobs and Hartmut Seifert for the documentary series OP – Schicksale im Klinikum [OP – Fate and fortunate in the clinic]
 Hans Grimmelmann for the TV film Blind Date – Flirt mit Folgen [Blind Date – a fateful flirt]
 Paul Hengge for the TV film  [The verdict]
 Günther Jauch and Marcel Reif for presenting the 1997–98 UEFA Champions League semi finals football game Real Madrid C.F. vs Borussia Dortmund
 Heiner Lauterbach for the TV films  and Opernball [Opera Ball]
 Klaus Löwitsch for the TV film  [The verdict]
 Franka Potente for the TV film Opernball [Opera Ball]
 Roland Suso Richter for the TV film 
 Nina Steinhauser for Tötet die Hure – Der Fall Maria Stuart [Kill the whore – the case of Mary, Queen of Scots]
 Dominik Graf special award for the TV films , Dr. Knock and Das Wispern im Berg der Dinge [The whispering inside the mountain of things]
 Peter Ustinov, Bavarian Prime Minister's award

1997 
 Percy Adlon for directing Hotel Adlon (BR/Arte)
 Heinrich Breloer special award for the TV film 
 Markus Fischötter and Andre Zalbertus for Einmal Hölle und zurück [Return ticket to hell]
 Evelyn Hamann for acting performance in Adelheid und ihre Mörder (ARD)
 Corinna Harfouch for acting performance in Der Ausbruch [The prison break] and Gefährliche Freundin [Dangerous girlfriend]
 Guido Knopp for the documentary series Hitlers Helfer [Hitler's helpers] (ZDF)
 Antje-Katrin Kühnemann for presenting the medical series Die Sprechstunde [The consultation] (BR)
 Rainer Laux for editing Leben im Ghetto [Life in the Ghetto]
 Ulrich Noethen for acting performance in Der Ausbruch [The prison break] and Busenfreunde [Bosom buddies]
 Johannes Reben as the author of Bruder Esel [Brother Donkey]
 Gernot Roll as cinematographer for Refuge (Unter die Haut) and A Girl Called Rosemary
 Christoph Waltz for acting performance in 
 Peter Welz for Viel Spaß mit meiner Frau [Have fun with my wife]
 Eduard Zimmermann, Bavarian Prime Minister's award

1996 
 Mario Adorf, Günter Strack and Heinz Hoenig for the TV film  (ZDF)
 Jo Baier for the comedy Der schönste Tag im Leben [The best day in your life] (ZDF)
 Monika Baumgartner, Bettina Kupfer and Kathrin Waligura for the TV films Sau sticht [lit. (the) sow jabs], Das Wunschkind, Für alle Fälle Stefanie  (ZDF)
 Michael von Dessauer for the series Welt der Wunder [World of Miracles] (Pro Sieben)
 Andrzej Falber and Ekkehard Kuhn for the documentary film Schlesien – Brücke in Europa Silesia – a bridge in Europe (ZDF)
 Christel Hinrichsen for the documentary series Lebenslinien [Life lines] (BR)
  for directing the action series  (RTL2)
 Peter Kloeppel for the news series RTL aktuell (RTL)
 Siegfried Lowitz, special award for acting performance
 Erni Singerl, special award for acting performance
 Lorin Maazel, Bavarian Prime Minister's award

1995 
 Gerd Anthoff for acting performance in Über Kreuz (BR/ARD)
 Wolf Bachofner, Karl Markovics and Tobias Moretti for the police series Inspector Rex (Sat.1)
 Reinhold Beckmann for the football magazine Ran – Sat.1 Bundesliga (Sat.1)
 Martina Gedeck for acting performance in Hölleisengretl (ZDF)
 Max Grießer, Thomas Hackenberg, April Hailer, Geert Müller-Gerbes and Lutz Reichart for the series Wie bitte? [Excuse me?] (RTL)
 Armin Maiwald for the episode "Nachkriegsmaus" [Post-war Mouse] from the children's series Die Sendung mit der Maus (WDR/ARD)
 Imo Moskowicz for directing Über Kreuz [Across] (BR/ARD)
 Christian Rischert for the portrait of the city of Vienna, Wiener Lust [Viennese lust] (BR/ARD)
 Andreas Christoph Schmidt for the documentary film Festung Berlin – Der Untergang der Reichshauptstadt [Fortress Berlin – The downfall of the Reich's capital] (SFB/ARD)
 , special award for the television film  (SDR/ARD/Arte)
 Uschi Glas, Bavarian Prime Minister's award

1994 
 Wigald Boning, Olli Dittrich, Stefan Jürgens, Mirco Nontschew, Tanja Schumann, Esther Schweins and Hugo Egon Balder as of the comedy show RTL Samstag Nacht (RTL)
 Joachim Bublath for the series Abenteuer Forschung [The adventure of research] and Die knoff-hoff Show [The 'knoff-hoff' show (a pun on the English "know-how")] (ZDF)
 Max Färberböck for the TV films Einer zahlt immer [There's always one who's got to pay] and Bella Block (ZDF)
 Wolf Gaudlitz for the documentary Gezählte Tage [Numbered days] (Radio Bremen/ARD)
 Arabella Kiesbauer for the talk show Arabella (ProSieben)
 Jennifer Nitsch for the series Nur eine kleine Affäre [Only a small affair] (ZDF)
 Udo Samel for the TV film Durchreise [Transit] (ZDF)
 Thekla Carola Wied for the television play Ich klage an [I accuse] (Sat.1)
 Henric L. Wuermeling, special award for the documentary Netzwerk [Network] (BR/ARD)
 Gerd Ruge, special award for his reports as ARD correspondent in Moscow
 Willy Millowitsch, Bavarian Prime Minister's award

1993 
 Ingo Bethke und Ulrich Brochhagen for the TV film Pulverfaß Provinz. Der 17. Juni 1953 im Bezirk Halle [The provincial tinderbox – the 17 June 2953 in the Halle district] (MDR)
 Gero von Boehm for the TV film Schöpfer Mensch [Creator Man] (SWF)
 Franz Xaver Bogner for the TV film Madame Bäurin [Madame farmer] (BR)
 Harald Juhnke for the TV film  (BR)
 Leslie Malton and Dieter Wedel for the TV film  (ZDF)
 Linda de Mol for the series Traumhochzeit [Wedding of your dreams] (RTL)
 Otto Schenk for the TV films Duett (WDR/ORF) and Die Sternstunde des Josef Bieder [Josef Bieder's moment of glory] (SDR/ORF)
 Karl Heinz Willschrei for "Poker" from the detective series Wolffs Revier [Wolff's precinct] (Sat.1)
 Herbert Reinecker, Bavarian Prime Minister's award

1992 
 Jürgen Bretzinger and Susanne Schneider for the TV film Fremde liebe Fremde [Stranger, dear stranger] (BR)
 Sabine Christiansen for the news program Tagesthemen (ARD)
 Maxim Dessau for the portrait Ugorski, denn seinen Freunden gibt er's schlafend [Ugorski – for he gives to his friends when they sleep] (ZDF)
 Christian Frey and Heiner Sylvester for the TV film Clara Mosch oder die schöpferische Zersetzung [Clara Mosch, or the creative disintegration] (MDR)
 Detlev Kleinert for the report Die Hölle von Sarajewo [The hell of Sarajevo] (BR)
 Roger Willemsen for the talk show 0137 (Premiere)
 Rudolf Mühlfenzl, honorary award
 Hans Christian Blech, Bavarian Prime Minister's award

1991 
 Ernst Arendt and Hans Schweiger for the TV film "Lied der Landschaft" [Song of the landscape] from the series "Tiere vor der Kamera" [lit.: animals in front of the camera] (BR)
 Erich Böhme for the talk show Talk im Turm [Talk in the tower] (Sat.1)
 Heinrich Breloer and Georg M. Hafner for the television play  [Colleague Otto – the co op affair] (WDR)
 Hellmuth Karasek, Sigrid Löffler and Marcel Reich-Ranicki for the series Das literarische Quartett [The literary Quartet] (ZDF)
 Hape Kerkeling for the program Total Normal [Totally normal] (Radio Bremen)
 Employees of the correspondent posts of ARD and ZDF in East Berlin
 Willy Purucker for the series Löwengrube [The lion's den] (BR)
 Peter Scholl-Latour for the documentary series Das Schwert des Islam [The sword of Islam]
 Sönke Wortmann, for the television film A Crazy Couple (ZDF)

1990 
 Jo Baier for the television film "Rosse" (BR)
 Jurek Becker, Manfred Krug and Werner Masten for the series Liebling Kreuzberg (SFB/NDR/WDR)
 Karin Brandauer for the TV films Marleneken [dialect for 'Little Marlene'] (ZDF) and Verkaufte Heimat [Sold homeland] (ORF/NDR)
 Nikolaus Brender and Georg M. Hafner for the report El Expectador – Der Tod schreibt mit [El Expectador – Death is taking notes] (WDR)
 Eva Mieke for the TV film Marleneken (ZDF)
 Günter Rohrbach for the series Rote Erde [Red soil] (WDR)
 Hartmut Schoen for the documentary Kälte, Mord und Perestroika [Cold, murder, and Perestroika] (ZDF)
 Dieter Wieland for the series Topographie [Topography] (BR)
 Peter von Zahn, Bavarian Prime Minister's award

1989 
 Fritz Egner for the show Dingsda [lit.: 'thingy'] (BR)
 Marianne Hoppe for the television play Bei Thea [At Thea's] (ZDF)
 Günther Jauch for the series Menschen [People], Na siehste [lit.: Look (I told you)] and Das aktuelle Sportstudio (ZDF)
 Franz Peter Wirth for Die unruhige Nacht [Restless night] and Ein Stück Himmel [A Square of Sky]
  for the TV series August '39 – Elf Tage zwischen Frieden und Krieg [August '39 – Eleven days between peace and war] (ARD)
 Dana Vávrová and Werner Stocker for Herbstmilch [Autumn Milk]
 Rüdiger Proske for the TV series Mitten in Europa – Deutsche Geschichte [In the heart of Europe – History of Germany] (Sat.1)
 Helmut Ringelmann, Bavarian Prime Minister's award

References

External links 
 
 Staatsregierung Bayern
  Richtlinien für die Vergabe des Bayerischen Fernsehpreises

Mass media in Bavaria
German television awards
Awards established in 1989
1989 establishments in West Germany